AFAS Live (formerly known as the Heineken Music Hall) is a concert hall in Amsterdam, Netherlands, near the Johan Cruyff Arena. The big hall, named "Black Box" has a capacity of 6,000 and is 3000 m2; a smaller hall for after parties (Beat Box) has a capacity of 700.

History

The venue was specially designed for amplified music by architect Frits van Dongen of Architekten Cie. The building was constructed between 1996 and 2001, and cost €30 million.

On September 16, 2016, it was announced that the name will be changed to AFAS Live on 1 January 2017. It is named after the venue's partner and sponsor AFAS Software BV (the acronym stands for Applications for Administrative Solutions) a business software developer in Leusden, the Netherlands with 450 employees.

Events
Many artists, both national and international, have performed at AFAS Live, including Bob Dylan, Floor Jansen, Beth Hart, Kelly Clarkson, Rag'n'Bone Man, Daft Punk, Take That, Westlife, Toto, Kylie Minogue, Avril Lavigne, Bring Me the Horizon, Rihanna, Selena Gomez, Louis Tomlinson, Michael Bolton, Katy Perry, Sam Smith, Within Temptation, Demi Lovato, Troye Sivan, Fifth Harmony, Tyler, the Creator, Monsta X, Blackpink, Twenty One Pilots, Halsey, Simple Minds, Disturbed and Spice Girls. Alter Bridge's Live from Amsterdam was recorded at the venue. The second concert featured in Within Temptation's live album Let Us Burn – Elements & Hydra Live in Concert was also recorded at the venue.

On 1 December 2012, AFAS Live (as Heineken Music Hall) hosted the Junior Eurovision Song Contest 2012.

On 7 April 2019, AFAS Live hosted the first out of five promotional events for the Eurovision Song Contest. Eurovision in Concert featured 28 acts, most of which competed amongst the 41 in the Eurovision Song Contest 2019, in which the Netherlands went on to win.

References

External links

  

Concert halls in Amsterdam
Music venues in the Netherlands
Amsterdam-Zuidoost